I Believe in Science is an Arabic-language website dedicated to publishing translations of science articles and research, with the aim of keeping the Arabic speaking world up-to-date with the latest scientific discoveries and accomplishments.  The project has amassed more than 2000 volunteers who managed to produce around 15000 scientific articles. Issam Fawaz is the CEO.

History 
The project started in 2011 by Ahmed Al-Rayes, an Iraqi geologist living in Lebanon, across social media platforms, the website was established in 2013. They paid tribute to a few of the women who volunteer translating research in March 2015 for International Women's Day. In 2016, the idea became an official NGO registered in both Lebanon and the European Union.

In 2012, the project adopted the slogan: I Believe in Science because it’s the only methodology that actually works

The project goals are:
 Removing and breaking the linguistic barriers that once prevented the Arabic speaking world from reaching true scientific knowledge, by creating a free uninfluenced platform to exchange knowledge and expertise
 Creating and encouraging an environment for the Arab speaking population, that belongs to a hostile culture towards scientific truth, to read and seek scientific knowledge
 Showing the efficiency of the scientific methodology in explaining the biggest phenomena's surrounding us by focusing on objectivity, refutability and applicability of natural sciences and their discoveries

Physicist Lawrence Krauss is among the scientists who have commented favorably on the project.

Similarly, biologist Robert Weinberg has said:

References

External links
IBelieveinSci.com (website)
I Believe in Science on Facebook

Internet properties established in 2011
Science websites
Organizations established in 2011
Lebanese educational websites
Non-profit organisations based in Lebanon
Arabic-language websites
Science and technology in Lebanon